Christopher J. McAllister (born June 16, 1975) is a Canadian former professional ice hockey defenceman who played in the National Hockey League (NHL) with the Vancouver Canucks, Toronto Maple Leafs, Philadelphia Flyers, Colorado Avalanche and New York Rangers.

Playing career
McAllister was drafted 40th overall by the Vancouver Canucks in the 1995 NHL Entry Draft.  After playing with the Canucks, McAllister played 56 games for the Toronto Maple Leafs from 1998–2000 before playing with the Philadelphia Flyers, Colorado Avalanche, and the New York Rangers.

He was traded from the Rangers to the Phoenix Coyotes during the NHL lockout in which during that time, McAllister played in the Elite Ice Hockey League for the Newcastle Vipers. He spent one full season with the Coyotes' AHL affiliate the San Antonio Rampage before signed for the Kalamazoo Wings of the UHL. McAllister recorded NHL career totals of four goals, seventeen assists and 634 penalty minutes in 301 regular season games as well as one assist in nine playoff games.  He is currently an instructor at a hockey school in Superior, Colorado.  On August 30, 2009 Chris signed a contract with the Wichita Thunder of the CHL.

Chris McAllister is considered to be one of the tallest players ever in NHL history.

Career statistics

Regular season and playoffs

References

External links
 

1975 births
Judson High School alumni
Canadian ice hockey defencemen
Colorado Avalanche players
Hershey Bears players
Sportspeople from Saskatoon
Kalamazoo Wings (UHL) players
Living people
Newcastle Vipers players
New York Rangers players
Philadelphia Flyers players
Philadelphia Phantoms players
San Antonio Rampage players
Saskatoon Blades players
Syracuse Crunch players
Toronto Maple Leafs players
Vancouver Canucks draft picks
Vancouver Canucks players
Wichita Thunder players
Ice hockey people from Saskatchewan
Canadian expatriate ice hockey players in England